This is a list of all waterways named as rivers in Lebanon. Lebanon has 22 rivers all of which are non navigable; 28 rivers originate on the western face of the Lebanon range and run through the steep gorges and into the Mediterranean Sea, the other 6 arise in the Beqaa Valley.

Sources:

References